Sing Along with Me  is a 1952 British musical film directed by Peter Graham Scott and starring Donald Peers, Dodo Watts and Dennis Vance. The screenplay concerns a grocer, played by Donald Peers, who wins a radio singing competition and is signed to a lucrative contract. The film was mainly a vehicle for Peers who was at the peak of his career at that time. He sang "Take My Heart", "If You Smile at the Sun", "Hoop Diddle-i-do-ra-li-ay", "Down at the Old Village Hall" and "I Left My Heart in a Valley in Wales".

Cast
 Donald Peers as David Parry 
 Dodo Watts as Gwynneth Evans 
 Dennis Vance as Harry Humphries 
 Jill Clifford as Shelia 
 Mercy Haystead as Gloria 
 Cyril Chamberlain as Jack Bates 
 Humphrey Morton as Syd Maxton 
 George Curzon as Mr Palmer 
 Leonard Morris as Uncle Ebeneezer

Reception
The review in Kinematograph Weekly stated "The picture presents Donald Peers with a simple yet effective vehicle for his screen debut, and he returns the compliment by easily adapting his flawless stage, radio and TV technique to the even more exacting demands of the "flicks." His friendly approach offsets his years, close-ups hold no terror for him, and, like the experienced trouper he is, he sees that all the ditties have rousing choruses."

References

External links

1952 films
1952 musical films
Films directed by Peter Graham Scott
British musical films
British black-and-white films
British Lion Films films
1950s English-language films
1950s British films